Party is a BBC Radio 4 sitcom. Based on his 2009 Edinburgh fringe play, the show was written by Tom Basden and produced by Julia McKenzie. The show also starred Tom Basden alongside Tim Key, Jonny Sweet, Anna Crilly and Katy Wix. The series surrounds young idealists who want to get into British politics but are naïve and have no idea how to.

Repeats of the series have also been broadcast on BBC Radio 4 Extra.

Cast
 Tom Basden as Simon
 Jonny Sweet as Jared
 Anna Crilly as Mel
 Katy Wix as Phoebe
 Tim Key as Duncan

Plot
The five characters are in their early twenties, fresh from leaving university and wanting to get into politics by forming a new political party (which, throughout the first two series, was unnamed as the group cannot decide on one, adopting the placeholder name of 'Team Jared' when contesting a by-election). Simon is direct and finds himself arguing with Mel on many key points, though he also has a quick wit. Jared sees himself as the leader of the group, while also providing the meeting venue of his parents' garden shed (or 'summer house' as he always insists on calling it). Mel also considers herself to be a leader figure and argues with Jared about the direction they should go, with her having a strong will. Phoebe is the optimist of the group, though is often somewhat naïve. Duncan is the new arrival to the group and was initially only invited because his stepfather owned a printing shop. He initially believed that his first meeting with the group was his birthday party, and is seen as dim-witted by the others. On occasion, he has taken on serious roles within the party by accident, briefly serving as leader after an impromptu leadership election resulted in everyone else being eliminated through disapproval voting, and being interviewed on local radio when the party contested a by-election in Corby albeit after being mistaken for Jared, the actual candidate.

Meetings are held to discuss policy, though the group spends much of the time in conflict and getting little done, with any policies that are suggested or adopted being outlandish, based on anecdotes or misconceptions, offensive, or otherwise terrible. These include:

 An actual ban on blankets (cf. blanket ban) to deter rough sleeping and drug use by the homeless.
 A requirement that spare bedrooms be used to accommodate the homeless (objected to by Jared for being a 'tax on people with nice houses').
 A 'Four Rs' education policy focusing on 'reading, writing, arithmetic and spelling'.
 Using buses as retirement homes to take advantage of free travel for the elderly.
 Establishing an all-dwarf country in Wales.
 A 'Don't You-rope us in' policy against further European integration and bail-outs (adopted to appeal to older Corby voters and because of minor irritations with paprika crisps, German techno music, and a foreign passenger on the train that the group was on when discussing European policy).
 Being 'for' China (agreed upon only because of confusion during voting on policy motions and time constraints).
 Revitalising the Corby trouser press industry to reduce youth unemployment (adopted primarily to appeal to Corby voters).
 Banning people from calling their children 'junior' (owing to confusion ahead of a protest against Donald Trump).
 Using Premier Inns as cost-effective alternatives to prisons whilst transferring the then-vacant prisons to the Premier Inn franchise.
 A statement that technology was making people stupid.
 Celebrating ability diversity by giving all disabled people gold medals (inspired by the 2012 Paralympics).
 A contrarian LGBTQ+ policy of 'getting them out of the graveyard and into the church', supporting marriage equality whilst barring gay people from cemeteries to prevent cottaging.
 Reviving Top of the Pops.
 Re-naming rapeseed to something less offensive.

Broadcast history
The first series was aired in March 2010, with four episodes being broadcast. A second four-episode series followed in June 2011. The third and final series was broadcast in September 2012. All episodes have a runtime of thirty minutes.

After a six year break, a thirty minute Christmas Special was broadcast on 26 December 2018. A repeat also aired as part of the BBC Radio 4 Comedy of the Week on the 31 December 2018.

Episodes
The first series did not make use of episode titles.

Series One

Series Two

Series Three

Specials

References

External links
Information from comedy.co.uk
Radio listings

BBC Radio comedy programmes
2010 radio programme debuts
BBC Radio 4 programmes